BookMooch is an international, online book exchange community founded by John Buckman in 2006. Membership, which by 2008 reached around 74,000 in over 90 countries, is open to anyone and is free. There is heavy community participation in its running and organization. As of 2008, about 2,000 books were swapped per day.

Site description

BookMooch allows its users to exchange books using a points system.  Members earn points by adding books to their inventories, sending books to other members, and providing feedback when they receive books.  The points earned can then be used to “buy” books from other members.  All books “cost” the same number of points, with a multiple-point surcharge for international mooches. Point exchange takes place at the beginning of any transaction, allowing “currency” to circulate quickly. Members may opt to send books only within their own country, worldwide, or worldwide upon request.

There is no waiting period for a new member to begin to participate in BookMooch.  Setting up an initial trading inventory will earn enough points to begin trading immediately.  Forum members encourage new members by keeping an eye out for new inventories and posting links to them.

Member pages contain biographical information, conditions of trade, and links to their transaction histories.  Widgets allow members to personalize their pages and listings.  Links to Amazon sites in various countries allow members to enter books into the system quickly.  A notification system e-mails members when a book on their Wishlist becomes available and directs them to the Mooch screen for that book.

Members may choose to donate points to a charity such as Books for Prisons, public libraries, education and counseling services, children's and military book charities.  Members may add to the charity list if they have a particular charity they want to support.  The charities can then use their points to acquire books.

Organization

John Buckman continues to maintain and add features to the site and run it with the assistance of a small, international admin team who participate in the forums and resolve any issues.  The Official BookMooch Blog records his travels, new BM projects, ideas and solicits input and feedback. Members of the forum contribute help and advice, feature suggestions, book talk, chat and “special offers.”

Member contributions

Members are active in suggesting and contributing features to the system. Member-run, associated BookMooch activities include:

The BookMooch Angel Network – In response to increases in postal rates which  discourage some users from mailing abroad, a group of volunteer “angels” exist who will mooch books within their own country and send them on to members in other countries;
The BookMooch Support Group is for members who commit to reading at least two of their stacked-up To Be Read piles during the month and post reviews to the Support Group's blog, The Smoke Lives.
The BookMooch Journal Project – Journals/Notebooks posted by a member for Mooching.  Each member who mooches contributes artwork or as directed by the originator and adds the book to their own inventory to be Mooched.
BookMooch Friends is a Yahoo social group for getting to know one another outside the trading environment
BookMooch Barter – where members can swap things other than books
BookMooch Lottery – an occasional activity where members pool points.  Half the pool goes to a random selection of members; half to charity.

Under discussion is a member-run Bank of BookMooch where members who are short of points can borrow and repay them later.  Members also write documentation and help features and maintain the BookMooch Wiki.

The site has an API allowing developers to create their own web applications.

Transparency

Transparency of behavior is a key component of BookMooch.  Recipients of books assign feedback to each transaction and a history for each member is open to view.  A balanced ratio of mooching to giving must be maintained by each member in order to continue to receive books. Both the forums and the feedback/e-mail systems generally allow users to resolve any differences amicably.

Income

BookMooch is a for-profit corporation wholly owned by Buckman, but it does not charge membership or use fees. Revenue is generated from users' voluntary fiscal contributions and from commissions when users purchase a book from Amazon.com through referral by the site. As of December 2006, for approximately every 30 books mooched, one book is purchased from Amazon.

See also
Book swapping

References

External links

BookMooch Blog

Press coverage
Today Show: Free for all: Get great stuff for nada (Jan 29, 2008)
New York Times, Clear the Bookshelf and Fill It Up Again, All Online (Oct 15, 2007)
CNET News Blog: BookMooch: Swap your books for free
The Guardian: Charlotte Northedge on book-swapping websites

Book swapping
Internet forums